Atrina serrata, or saw-toothed pen shell, is a species of bivalve mollusc in the family Pinnidae. It can be found along the Atlantic coast of North America, ranging from North Carolina to Texas and the West Indies.

References

Pinnidae
Bivalves described in 1825